Angraecum germinyanum is a species of orchid. This species is found in Madagascar with a waxy flower occurring in spring and summer.

References

External links 
 

germinyanum
Orchids of Madagascar